The golden palm weaver (Ploceus bojeri) is a species of bird in the weaver family, Ploceidae. It is found in eastern Africa.

References

External links
 Golden palm weaver -  Species text in Weaver Watch.

golden palm weaver
Birds of the Horn of Africa
golden palm weaver
Taxonomy articles created by Polbot